The Mandela Trophy was a one-day International cricket tournament which took place from 2 December 1994 to 12 January 1995. The tournament was hosted by South Africa, who were one of the four sides competing, with the others being New Zealand, Pakistan and Sri Lanka. Each side played each other twice before the two with the most points took part in a best of three finals series. The finals were contested between Pakistan and South Africa with the hosts winning 2–0.

Man of the Series Aamer Sohail scored 432 runs while his teammate Waqar Younis was the tournament's leading wicket taker with 21 victims. The tournament saw Sanath Jayasuriya, Adam Parore, Dave Callaghan and Michael Rindel all make their maiden ODI hundreds.

Squads

Points table

Group matches

1st match

2nd match

3rd match

4th match

5th match

6th match

7th match

8th match

9th match

10th match

11th match

12th match

Final series

South Africa won the best of three final series against Pakistan 2-0.

1st Final

2nd Final

Statistical leaders

Most runs

Most wickets

References

External links
CricketArchive tournament page

International cricket competitions from 1994–95 to 1997
1994 in South African cricket
1995 in South African cricket
One Day International cricket competitions